Skua Terrace is a terrace in the northwest part of Signy Island, South Orkney Islands, extending north-south from the vicinity of Spindrift Rocks to the vicinity of Express Cove. Named in 1980 by the United Kingdom Antarctic Place-Names Committee (UK-APC) from the numerous pairs of brown skuas nesting in the area.

Plateaus of Antarctica
Landforms of the South Orkney Islands